Tephritis matricariae is a species of tephritid or fruit flies in the genus Tephritis of the family Tephritidae.

Distribution
Netherlands, Austria & Balkans South to Mediterranean, Turkey, Egypt.

References

Tephritinae
Insects described in 1844
Diptera of Asia
Diptera of Europe